A World Upside Down: The Mixxtape was released June 4, 2013 on Hatchet House and its parent company Psychopathic Records by DJ Clay.  The mixtape, DJ Clay's first for three years, was released on the Psychopathic Records label.

Track listing

References

2013 mixtape albums